Ivar Tallo (born 5 May 1964 in Tartu) is an Estonian political scientist and politician. He was a member of IX Riigikogu.

In 2000, Estonian Newspaper Association gave him the award "Press Friend of the Year".

References

Living people
1964 births
Estonian political scientists
Social Democratic Party (Estonia) politicians
Members of the Riigikogu, 1999–2003
Saint Petersburg State University alumni
McGill University alumni
Academic staff of the University of Tartu
Politicians from Tartu